Mario González may refer to:

Sports
 Mario González (cyclist) (born 1992), Spanish cyclist
 Mário Gonzalez (golfer) (1922–2019), Brazilian professional golfer
 Mario González (footballer, born 1950), Uruguayan footballer
 Mario González (footballer, born 1996), Spanish footballer
 Mario González (footballer, born 1997), Salvadoran footballer
 Mario González (judoka) (born 1971), Mexican judoka
 Mario González (Mexican boxer) (born 1969), Mexican Olympic boxer
 Mario González (swimmer) (born 1975), Cuban Olympic swimmer
 Mario González (Uruguayan boxer) (born 1901), Uruguayan Olympic boxer
 Mario González (wrestler) (born 1983), Mexican professional wrestler
 Mario Tovar González (1933–2011), Mexican wrestler

Others
 Mario González, brother of Chihuahua state's Attorney General Patricia Gonzalez, connected with Operation Fast and Furious
 Mario Gonzalez (1984/1985 – 2021), man killed during police arrest in Alameda, California